Nino Anderlini (10 March 1926 – 24 February 2004) was an Italian cross-country skier who competed in the early 1950s. He finished sixth in the 4 x 10 km relay at the 1952 Winter Olympics in Oslo.

References

Wallechinsky, David. (1984). The Complete Book of the Olympics: 1896-1980. "4x10-kilometer relay". New York: Penguin Books. p. 617.

Olympic cross-country skiers of Italy
Cross-country skiers at the 1952 Winter Olympics
Italian male cross-country skiers
1926 births
2004 deaths